Solveig Margrete Fiske (born 26 October 1952) is a bishop in the Church of Norway, serving the Diocese of Hamar.

Originally from Frei in Møre og Romsdal, she graduated from the Free Faculty of Theology (now the MF Norwegian School of Theology) in 1980, and completed her practical examinations there in 1981. She briefly worked as a consultant for the Church Council in 1981, followed by an assignment to the parish in Elverum as a chaplain between 1982 and 1994. In 1994, she became the parish priest in Løten, a position she held for 12 years.

As bishop of Hamar, she succeeded the first female bishop in the church of Norway, Rosemarie Köhn, and became the fourth woman to be ordained bishop in Norway. Olav Skjevesland, bishop in the Diocese of Agder and Telemark, officiated at her consecration. On , she went public with the view that the Church of Norway should develop a church liturgy for the establishment of same-sex partnerships. Following Norway's starting to certify same-sex marriages in 2009, the Church of Norway adopted a new liturgy suitable for wedding same-sex couples in 2017.

Appointments
In addition to her pastoral assignments, she has served in a number of committees and councils, notably:
 As member of the church council for the diocese of Hamar
 The regional board in the Norwegian ministerial association
 Since 1982, as a member of the parish council for Løten and Elverum
 A number of church task forces related to the role of women in religious life
 Since 2004, chair of the board of the church's resource center against violence and sexual assault

References
 Biography by the diocese of Hamar

Citations

Bishops of Hamar
Women Lutheran bishops
MF Norwegian School of Theology, Religion and Society alumni
21st-century Lutheran bishops
People from Møre og Romsdal
1952 births
Living people